HMS Pheasant was one of 85 Admiralty M-class destroyers built during the First World War for the Royal Navy. She hit and was sunk by a mine in 1917.

Description
The Admiralty M class were improved and faster versions of the preceding . They displaced . Pheasant was powered by a single Brown-Curtis direct-drive steam turbine turning three propeller shafts, using steam provided by three Yarrow boilers. The ships' complement was 76 officers and ratings.

The ships were armed with three single QF  Mark IV guns and a QF 2-pounder "pom-pom" anti-aircraft gun. They were also fitted with two above-water twin mounts for  torpedoes.

Construction and career
Pheasant was ordered as part of the 5th War Emergency Programme in May 1915. She was built by Fairfield Shipbuilding and Engineering Company at its shipyard in Govan on the Clyde and  launched on 23 October 1916. Completed in December she was assigned to the Grand Fleet, joining the 15th Destroyer Flotilla. On the morning of 1 March 1917 the destroyer, together with a number of armed trawlers, was taking part in a routine patrol of the Western entrance to Scapa Flow, the Grand Fleet's anchorage in the Orkneys. Pheasant was off Hoy when the trawlers observed a large explosion, due to Partridge striking a mine. The destroyer sank with the loss of 89 lives.

References

Bibliography
 
 
 
 
 

 

World War I destroyers of the United Kingdom
Admiralty M-class destroyers
1916 ships
Protected Wrecks of the United Kingdom